Claude Royce Gordy (December 24, 1931 – October 26, 1971) was an American politician from the state of Iowa.

Gordy was born in Bloomfield, Davis County, Iowa in 1931. He served as a Democrat for one term in the Iowa House of Representatives from January 12, 1959 to January 8, 1961. Gordy died in Bloomfield in 1971. He was interred in Barker Cemetery in Hitt, Scotland County, Missouri.

References

1931 births
1971 deaths
People from Bloomfield, Iowa
Iowa Democrats
20th-century American politicians